Todsapol Karnplook (Thai ทศพล การปลูก) is a Thai retired footballer.

Honours

Thailand Premier League 2004/05 championship with Thailand Tobacco Monopoly FC

External links
Profile at Thaipremierleague.co.th

1980 births
Living people
Todsapol Karnplook
Todsapol Karnplook
Association football midfielders
Association football fullbacks
Todsapol Karnplook